Monzambano was the name of at least two ships of the Italian Navy and may refer to:

 , a  launched in 1888 and scrapped in 1901
 , a  launched in 1923 and stricken in 1951

Italian Navy ship names